Nuria Llagostera Vives and María José Martínez Sánchez were the defending champions; however, they chose to compete in the 2010 Dubai Tennis Championships instead.
Gisela Dulko and Edina Gallovits defeated Olga Savchuk and Anastasiya Yakimova 6–2, 7–6(6) in the final.

Seeds

Draw

Draws

External links
Doubles Draw

Copa Sony Ericsson Colsanitas - Doubles
Copa Colsanitas